Raymond Owen McKay (born August 22, 1946 in Edmonton, Alberta) is a former professional ice hockey defenceman. He played in the National Hockey League with the Chicago Black Hawks, Buffalo Sabres, and California Golden Seals from 1968 to 1974. He also played in the World Hockey Association with the Edmonton Oilers, Cleveland Crusaders, Birmingham Bulls, and Minnesota Fighting Saints from 1974 to 1978.

In his NHL career, McKay played in 140 games, scoring two goals and adding sixteen assists. In the WHA, McKay played in 212 games, scoring fourteen goals and adding forty-four assists.

Ray currently runs "Ray McKay's Hockey Specialized Training" program, based in Ilderton, Ontario.

Career statistics

Regular season and playoffs

Awards
 CMJHL First All-Star Team – 1967

References

External links
 

1946 births
Living people
Adirondack Red Wings players
Birmingham Bulls players
Buffalo Sabres players
California Golden Seals players
Canadian ice hockey coaches
Canadian ice hockey defencemen
Chicago Blackhawks players
Cincinnati Swords players
Cleveland Crusaders players
Dallas Black Hawks players
Diavoli HC Milano players
Edmonton Oilers (WHA) players
HC Varese players
Hershey Bears players
Medicine Hat Tigers coaches
Minnesota Fighting Saints players
Moose Jaw Canucks players
Portland Buckaroos players
Springfield Indians players
Ice hockey people from Edmonton